Littleworth is a hamlet in Burnham civil parish, in the South Bucks district of Buckinghamshire, England.

There are two pubs (The Blackwood Arms and the Jolly Woodman) and Dropmore Infant School. To the west are the fenced off grounds of Dropmore House which was built in about 1792 for William Wyndham and a gatehouse to it called Oak Lodge.

Parish church
The Church of England parish church of Saint Anne, Dropmore is a brick and flint Gothic Revival building designed by William Butterfield and built in 1866. The south aisle was added in 1877, probably also designed by Butterfield. The building is Grade II* listed.

References

Hamlets in Buckinghamshire
Burnham, Buckinghamshire